This is a list of lesbian, gay, bisexual, and transgender people whose suicides were deemed sufficiently notable to be reported by the media.

See also 

 Suicide among LGBT youth
 Suicide prevention
 It Gets Better Project
 Lesbian Gay Bi Trans Youth Line
 The Trevor Project

References 

Suicide-related lists
Suicides